The siege of Đông Quan was a 15th-century siege of the Ming dynasty city of Đông Quan by Vietnamese rebels led by Lê Lợi. Đông Quan was besieged for every year that the war raged. Lê Lợi's first siege attempt came at the Battle of Thanh Hoa, where he defeated the enemy. The Battles of the Ma River were also victories, though the first battle was a defeat. After the Battle of Tot Dong, Vietnamese forces could look to capture the city. Soon, the relief force was defeated at the Battles of Lang Son and the Red River Valley. Hanoi fell the day the war ended.

References

Đông Quan
Đông Quan
Later Lê dynasty
Đông Quan
Đông Quan
1410s in Asia
1420s in Asia
1418 in Asia
1428 in Asia